is a Japanese manga series written and illustrated by Ichtys. The story centers around the Hero Exa and the Demon Queen Sheila along with the corresponding war between the demon and human races. It was published in Square Enix's Gangan Powered from June 2004 to February 2009. After Gangan Powered ceased its publication, the series was transferred to Monthly GFantasy, and re-titled Superior Cross, and serialized from April 2009 to July 2011. A Drama CD was released by Frontier Works in March 2007.

Plot 
Superior takes place in a world where humans and monsters co-exist, but for many years, both races have been at war, aiming for the complete extermination of each other. The powerful Demon Queen Sheila arises to lead the monsters. She is extremely powerful, and slays half of humanity by herself. The surviving humans elect a Hero, Exa, to kill the Demon Queen and liberate humanity from her oppressive rule.  But Exa questions his mission.  He is anguished by the knowledge that all monsters are living creatures, the same as humans, and he doesn't wish to kill any of them. Sheila becomes interested in Exa's principles and decides infiltrate his side. Eventually she realizes that she has fallen in love with Exa, who, despite his desire for peaceful co-existence, has vowed to kill the Demon Queen himself.

Characters 

The Demon Queen who personally wiped out half of humanity and subjugated all the monsters. After experiencing the loss of her beloved dragon at a young age, she decided to kill as many humans as she could so as to create a world for monsters and monsters only. Upon meeting the Hero, Sheila decided she would approach him so as to get close to him, and kill him when the opportunity came; however, she finds herself to have accidentally developed romantic feelings for Exa. And so, putting up the façade of a meek monster, Sheila joins him in his journey. On the way to find the Demon Lord, she starts to change her sadistic behavior due to the Hero's influence on her. Later on, she finds herself in a dilemma; to tell the hero her true identity or keep pretending to be a weak demon in order to stay by his side.

The Hero who dreams of monsters and humans co-existing in harmony. He values all monster and human life, and does not wish to kill anyone, firmly believing that the war can end without the complete extermination of one race. Despite his philosophy, he will make an exception for the Demon Lord, whom Exa can never forgive for the atrocious crimes the Demon Queen has committed, as well as for the murder of his family and friends at the hands of the latter. Exa believes that with the death of the Demon Lord, peace could be restored to the world. However, he does not know that Sheila is the Demon Lord (despite others telling him so) and later on falls in love with her. In Superior Cross Sheila tells him that she is the Demon Lord, after which he becomes very violent. In a frenzy to kill Sheila, he attacks Lakshri and Angelica (who were trying to protect Sheila), to get to her. In the middle of a fight, they all fall into a lava hole and in order to save them Sheila sacrifices herself. The Hero, unable to let her die after all, saves her and apologizes.

Exa's right-hand man. In the past, he was consumed by violence, but was pulled out of it with the aid of Exa. After that Lakshri swore that he would follow him for the rest of his life.
Despite being good friends with Exa he clearly lacks the latter's modesty and humbleness, often bragging about his skills (especially with women, for Lakshri becomes infatuated with almost every women that he sees), as well as displaying a certain degree of immaturity or lack of manners (usually when he's around Angelica or Crowe).
His name could also be translated as "Luxury".

A quarter monster, with extremely strong and inherited magical abilities. Abused as a child for her demonic abilities, she is devoted to Exa, as he was the first person to show her kindness. Oddly enough, her jeweled staff is used to control and limit her power, but not to enhance it. Angelica's right eye is red due to her monster blood, which she inherited from one of her grandparents. To avoid conflict and controversy with the other humans, Angelica hides her right eye behind her bangs.
While usually a kind and gentle person, whenever she loses her temper she will use her superhuman strength against the one who has upset her (usually Lakshri). In Superior Cross she finds her grandfather living in a human town, after she realizes he is her grandpa he tells her that he had to leave the town he and her grandma were living on, due to the humans threatening him because of him being a monster, but he never stopped loving his family.

The current Demon Queen who was formed by Sheila in an attempt to hide her true identity. Reckless and violent, she sees every human and monster without exception as hers to kill as she pleases. However, she plans to break apart Hero and Sheila in an attempt to kill them both and prove herself to be the strongest of them all, and rule over the entire world.
After facing Sheila and Hero on separate occasions she has decided to "work together" with all other monsters to destroy humanity.

Son of the King, he idolized Exa as a harbinger of peace who would aid his father in exterminating the demons. However, when he met Exa and found out he was a pacifist because he refused to kill two humanoid monsters, the Prince was severely disappointed. After he is spared by one of the two monsters that Exa saved, however, he converts to Exa's philosophy and provides to be a valuable ally. However, it is he who sends his aide to warn Exa of his suspicions that Sheila is the real Demon Queen.

A tentacled monster with an ability to control another being's mind. Kagami has served as Sheila's guardian ever since she was a child, it is also revealed that Kagami had admired Sheila's mother and has vowed to groom Sheila to be the perfect Demon Lord when he found out that Sheila's parents was killed by humans. He also hated Exa for being the reason on why Sheila had a change of heart.

Publication 
Superior is written and illustrated by Ichtys. It was serialized in Square Enix's Gangan Powered from June 22, 2004 to February 21, 2009. It was then transferred to Monthly GFantasy, re-titled , and serialized from April 18, 2009 to July 16, 2011. Square Enix collected the series's chapters into individual tankōbon volumes. Nine volumes of Superior were released from March 22, 2005 to April 22, 2009. Six volumes of Superior Cross were released from September 26, 2009 to October 27, 2011.

The series has been licensed in France by Ki-oon. The nine volumes of Superior were published from October 8, 2009 to December 9, 2010. The six volumes of Superior Cross were published from April 14, 2011 to February 23, 2012.

Volume list

Superior

Superior Cross

References

Further reading

External links 
 Superior at Gangan Powered official website 
 Superior at GFantasy official website 
 

Adventure anime and manga
Fantasy anime and manga
Gangan Comics manga
Manga series
Romance anime and manga
Shōnen manga